Mike Legg (born May 25, 1975) is a Canadian former ice hockey player. He is most famous for the Michigan goal, named in honor of one that he scored while playing for the University of Michigan, in a 1996 NCAA Tournament game against the University of Minnesota, in which he picked the puck up onto his stick behind the net and wrapped it around into the top corner of the net. The goal was widely recognized around the hockey world; Legg was awarded "Goal of the Year" by Inside Hockey and the stick he used was donated to the Hockey Hall of Fame. This move has since been attempted by many other players, including Ryan Getzlaf and Tyler Ennis. The first successful NHL attempt of this move came from Andrei Svechnikov of the Carolina Hurricanes, scoring against Calgary Flames goaltender David Rittich.  Svechnikov managed the feat a second time against the Winnipeg Jets, scoring on goaltender Connor Hellebuyck. Legg originally learned it from Bill Armstrong.

Although drafted by the New Jersey Devils in 1993 , Legg did not reach "The Show" in North America. Throughout his career, he played for HIFK and KalPa of the Finnish SM-liiga, as well as the ECHL's San Antonio Iguanas, Fort Wayne Komets, Lubbock Cotton Kings, Idaho Steelheads, and Utah Grizzlies.

References

External links
 

1975 births
Living people
Augusta Lynx players
Canadian ice hockey right wingers
Fort Wayne Komets players
HIFK (ice hockey) players
Ice hockey people from Ontario
KalPa players
Michigan Wolverines men's ice hockey players
San Antonio Iguanas players
Sportspeople from London, Ontario
Utah Grizzlies (AHL) players
New Jersey Devils draft picks
Dallas Stallions players
Canadian expatriate ice hockey players in Finland
Canadian expatriate ice hockey players in the United States
NCAA men's ice hockey national champions